The Harry Diamond Laboratories (HDL) was a research facility of the Ordnance Development Division of the National Bureau of Standards and later the US Army, most notable for its work on proximity fuzes in World War II. The organization was founded in 1940, but was not named after its first director Harry Diamond until 1962.  HDL was one of seven Army laboratories merged to form the new Army Research Laboratory in 1992.

History 
In 1940, concerned about increasing warfare abroad, the National Defense Research Committee organized a group of scientists and engineers into the Ordnance Development Division of the National Bureau of Standards (NBS), to develop fuzes for non-rotating (fin-stabilized) munitions such as bombs, rockets and mortar shells. Harry Diamond, a pioneer radio engineer, was given technical direction of the program, a position he held until his death in 1948. Proximity fuzes were first used in combat in January 1943, and the U.S. War Department later described the proximity fuze as "one of the outstanding scientific developments of World War II ... second only to the atomic bomb" in military importance.

In 1952, the Ordnance Development Division was transferred from NBS to the Army as a research and development (R&D) installation and named the Diamond Ordnance Fuze Laboratories (DOFL) in honor of its early leader. DOFL made significant contributions in areas such as printed circuits, casting resins, flow and temperature measurement, reserve power supplies, high-resolution radar, air navigation systems and nuclear effects studies.

In a 1962 Army reorganization, DOFL was assigned directly to the Army Materiel Command (AMC) as a corporate laboratory; in 1963, its name was officially changed to Harry Diamond Laboratories (HDL). AMC later established the Electronics Research and Development Command (ERADCOM) as subordinate command, with HDL reporting to that command.  HDL was subsequently transferred to the Army Laboratory Command (LABCOM).

In 1972, Jack Anderson reported that HDL was working on "short-time-span control of human behavior", which Anderson characterized as "Experiments to control human behavior with science fiction devices".  An Army spokesman responded that the research program was looking at alternative ways for crowd control.

In 1992, the Army created the Army Research Laboratory (ARL) by combining seven existing Army laboratories including HDL.

Locations 
In 1940, the laboratory was located at Connecticut Ave. and Van Ness St. in Washington, DC.

It also had a test range at Blossom Point, Maryland, a  U.S. Army installation near La Plata, Maryland, and research facilities at Woodbridge, Virginia.

The Woodbridge site was closed in the 1990s, after the Army decided to stop electromagnetic pulse testing there. In 1989, the commander of the HDL said that the decision to stop this testing was mainly based on the Army's need to perform more powerful testing, something not appropriate for the thickly settled neighborhood around the site. In 1997, the  became the Occoquan Bay National Wildlife Refuge.

References

Further reading

External links 
College recruiting advertisement, October 18, 1966, Daily Collegian, University of Pennsylvania

Closed research facilities of the United States Army
Historic American Engineering Record in Maryland
Laboratories in the United States
National Institute of Standards and Technology 
Science and technology in Maryland